Wrights Fork is an unincorporated community in Caroline County, in the U.S. state of Virginia. The community is the home of NRHP-listed Green Falls home.

References

Unincorporated communities in Virginia
Unincorporated communities in Caroline County, Virginia